The men's scratch competition at the 2021 UEC European Track Championships was held on 7 October 2021.

Results
First rider across the line without a net lap loss wins.

References

Men's scratch
European Track Championships – Men's scratch